Lukáš Nechvátal (born 10 March 1981) is a professional Czech football
player. He made 16 appearances in the Gambrinus liga for 1. FK Příbram.

References
Notes

Sources
Guardian Football

Czech footballers
1981 births
Living people
Czech First League players
1. FK Příbram players

Association football midfielders